Leandro Tomaz Perez (born July 29, 1979) is a former Brazilian football player.

Club statistics

References

External links

1979 births
Living people
Brazilian footballers
Brazilian expatriate footballers
Expatriate footballers in Japan
J2 League players
Mito HollyHock players
Association football midfielders